Bijibal Maniyil is an award-winning Indian music composer and playback singer who works predominantly in Malayalam films, documentaries, short films and television commercials. He has composed for more than 150 feature films, several documentaries and television commercials.

Career 
Bijibal entered the film industry as a composer in 2007, with the film satirical drama Arabikatha starring Sreenivasan and directed by Lal Jose.

In 2013, he won the National Film Award for Best Background Score and Kerala State Film Award for the film Kaliyachan. He has also composed for several non-film Malayalam albums including Vasco Da Gama. He has also often composed for short films besides directing the short titled Sundari and also composing its score. He also composed the music for the door-opening and door-closing notification system in Kochi Metro trains which continues to be in use to this date.

He has composed music for films including Arabikatha, Pathemari, Loudspeaker , Munnariyippu, 101 Chodyangal, Vellimoonga, Balyakalasakhi, Maheshinte Prathikaaram,  Thondimuthalum Driksakshiyum, Rakshadhikari Baiju Oppu, Aby, Android Kunjappan Version 5.25, Carbon and Vellam: The Essential Drink and Thankam among others.

Personal life
Bijibal started composing during his college days at St. Albert's College, Ernakulam. He was married to Santhi, who was a dancer by profession. Their marriage was held on 21 June 2002, after a brief relationship and long before Bijibal even entered the film industry. They have two children, Devadutt and Daya. Santhi, who was a post graduate in Bharatanatyam and was doing her research in Mohiniyattam died after a stroke on 29 August 2017, aged just 36. Their children Devadutt and Daya sang for films, and Daya is more popular for singing and appearing in the video of Onam Vannallo, a rhyme made as a part of the Onam festival in 2014.

Discography

Awards

References

External links 

Living people
Malayalam film score composers
Malayalam playback singers
Best Background Score National Film Award winners
Year of birth missing (living people)